Porcupine Gorge National Park is a national park in Porcupine, Shire of Flinders in North West Queensland, Australia, 1,174 km northwest of Brisbane and 60 km north of Hughenden.  Established in 1970, the national park has an area of 54.10 km2 and is managed by the Queensland Parks and Wildlife Service.  It is an IUCN category II park.

The national park was established in the area surround Porcupine Gorge.  The gorge features strata of sedimentary rocks which span hundreds of millions of years.

Fauna
The park provides habitat for the rock-wallaby, Pacific black duck, crimson-winged parrot and black bittern.

See also

 Protected areas of Queensland

References

External links
 Porcupine Gorge National Park

National parks of Queensland
North West Queensland
Protected areas established in 1970
1970 establishments in Australia
Shire of Flinders (Queensland)